Haplochromis simotes is a species of cichlid endemic to the Victorian Nile where it is only known with certainty from Kakindu and questionable records from Ripon Falls, both in Uganda. This algae-feeder (leading to comparisons with Tropheus) is found in fast-flowing waters over a rocky bottom. Although rated as data deficient by the IUCN, its range is very small and it could easily become extinct as a result of already-planned dams.

References

simotes
Endemic freshwater fish of Uganda
Fish described in 1911
Taxonomy articles created by Polbot